Kauko Paananen (7 October 1924 – 20 December 2001) was a Finnish equestrian. He competed in two events at the 1956 Summer Olympics.

References

External links
 

1924 births
2001 deaths
Finnish male equestrians
Olympic equestrians of Finland
Equestrians at the 1956 Summer Olympics
People from Kuopio
Sportspeople from North Savo